Peltopleuriformes is an extinct order of ray-finned fish.

Classification
 Order †Peltopleuriformes Lehman 1966 [Peltopleuroidei Lehman 1966]
 Family †Peltopleuridae Bough 1939
 Genus †Marcopoloichthys Tintori et al. 2008
 Genus †Placopleurus Brough
 Genus †Peltopleurus Kner 1866a [Tripelta Wade 1940]
 Superfamily †Thoracopteroidea Shen & Arratia 2022
 Family †Wushaichthyidae Shen & Arratia 2022
 Genus †Wushaichthys Xu et al. 2015
 Genus †Peripeltopleurus Bürgin 1992
 Family †Thoracopteridae Griffith 1977 sensu Shen & Arratia 2022
 Genus †Pterygopterus Kner 1867 [Pterygopterus Kner 1867 non Butler 1876]
 Genus †Urocomus Costa 1862
 Genus †Thoracopterus Bronn 1858
 Genus †Gigantopterus Abel 1906
 Genus †Potanichthys Xu et al. 2012
 Genus †Italopterus Shen & Arratia 2022

Timeline of genera

Bibliography

References

External links

 
Prehistoric ray-finned fish orders